The 2020 Florida Republican presidential primary took place on March 17, 2020, as one of the three contests scheduled on that date in the Republican Party presidential primaries for the 2020 presidential election.

Results
Incumbent United States president Donald Trump was challenged by three candidates: businessman and perennial candidate Rocky De La Fuente of California, former congressman Joe Walsh of Illinois, and former governor Bill Weld of Massachusetts. Walsh withdrew from the race prior to the primary.

Results by county

References

Florida Republican
Republican primary
Florida Republican primaries